The St. Francis Yacht Club is a private sailing club located in San Francisco.

History
Founded in 1927, the Saint Francis Yacht Club (StFYC) was formed when some of the members of the San Francisco Yacht Club decided to move their clubhouse from Sausalito to Belvedere, California to escape the rapidly growing commercial activity of Sausalito.  This was prior to the construction of the Golden Gate Bridge, and travel to Marin County from San Francisco was entirely by water. A group of San Francisco Yacht Club members wished to relocate the club to the City of San Francisco to make it easier to access the Clubhouse. No agreement between the two factions was reached and the group favoring a San Francisco location split off to found StFYC. StFYC has become generally considered to be the most prestigious yacht club in the western United States.  Membership in the club is by invitation only.

San Francisco Clubhouse

StFYC hired the famous San Francisco architect Willis Polk to design their clubhouse which was then built on land leased from San Francisco by the club on the jetty off of Crissy Field in the Marina District, San Francisco, on landfill created for the 1915 Panama Pacific International Exposition. Polk died before the blueprints could be completed but his office finished them. The Mediterranean Revival-style building enjoys views from the Bridge to Alcatraz Island and beyond.

On December 21, 1976 the original Clubhouse caught fire during a party. One member was killed and seven badly injured. The membership rallied to rebuild the western half of the Clubhouse which had been destroyed in the fire. On October 17, 1989, the Loma Prieta earthquake damaged the Clubhouse and extensive foundation repairs were required. Once again, the membership rallied to repair the beloved clubhouse.

With some of the best water views in San Francisco, the StFYC Clubhouse has three eating venues: A formal main dining room on the second story, the Clippership bar also on the second story, and the Grill Room a snug gathering place on the ground . In response to the COVID-19 pandemic, StFYC has added two outdoor eating areas: The Race Deck, located on the rooftop of the Clubhouse, and the Courtyard, centrally located and protected from the strong winds of San Francisco Bay.

Sailboat Racing at StFYC

StFYC assembled a syndicate to compete for the 2000 Louis Vuitton Cup, with their entry, AmericaOne. Their entry was defeated in the semifinals by Italy's Prada.

StFYC sponsors numerous regattas and races for sailboats of all sizes. These include the Rolex Big Boat Series for large yachts of all kinds, Kleinman/Swiftsure Regatta, Elvstrom/Zellerbach regatta, Jessica Cup for classic yachts, and numerous one-design events. An annual highlight is the Opti Heavy Weather regatta sailed on the windy north shore of the City of San Francisco, right in front of the StFYC Clubhouse. Youngsters test their skill and stamina in this cherished event.

StFYC has hosted numerous World, Continental, and National Championships including the 5O5, Farr-40, Meges-24, Farr-30, Express-27, Express-37, and many others.

Flagships

The St. Francis has had many flagships over the years including some historic craft.
 USS Zaca (IX-73)

Tinsley Island Outstation

StFYC maintains an outstation on Tinsley Island a few miles west of Stockton, California in the Sacramento–San Joaquin River Delta. Every year, the members of StFYC and their guests visit Tinsley Island for cruises, events, and sailing classes. Heavily used during the summer months, the outstation is open and staffed year-round. Many members cherish the peace and slower pace of winter months on Tinsley Island.

The facilities include dockage for boats, swimming, accommodations in a lighthouse built in the late 1800s and other buildings, small boats to sail and paddle, and various sporting events.

Reciprocity

The St. Francis Yacht Club warmly welcomes sailors from all over the world.

Like many yacht clubs on the West Coast, St.FYC is a member of the Pacific Inter-Club Yacht Association, which provides reciprocal privileges between members of hundreds of other yacht clubs. St.FYC also shares reciprocity with clubs around the world including:  The New York Yacht Club, Outrigger Canoe Club, Royal Prince Alfred Yacht Club, Royal Thames Yacht Club, Société Nautique de Gèneve, Yacht Club de Monaco and Norddeutscher Regatta Verein.

If you wish to visit the St. Francis Yacht Club, visit their StFYC Home Page.

Notable members

The club has had many notable members in its history
 Tom Blackaller, world-champion yachtsman and America's Cup helmsman, Sailing Hall of Fame member 
 Paul Cayard, Olympian and America's Cup competitor, Sailing Hall of Fame member 
 John Kostecki, Olympian and America's Cup competitor, Sailing Hall of Fame member 
 Gary Jobson, sailing author and America's Cup tactician, Sailing Hall of Fame member 
 Pamela Healy, pioneering female sailor and Olympian, Sailing Hall of Fame member 
 Stan Honey, renowned navigator, founder of Etak and SportVision, Sailing Hall of Fame member, 2010 Yachtsman of the Year, two time Emmy Award winner
 Daniela Moroz, 4-time Formula Kiteboard World Champion, 2-time US Yachtswoman of the Year 
Christopher Michel, American Photographer
 Myron Spaulding, yacht designer 
 Roy E. Disney, yachtsman, former CEO of the Walt Disney Company and nephew of Walt Disney
 Ed Zelinsky, founder of the Musée Mécanique
 James David Zellerbach, businessman and US Ambassador
 John Barneson, early California oil baron 
 Clarence W. W. Mayhew, modernist architect

Staff Commodores 
Past Commodores of the St. Francis Yacht Club are:
 John M. Punnett, 1927–28
 Hiram W. Johnson Jr., 1929–30
 Henry W. Dinning, 1931
 Philip S. Baker, 1932–33
 Cyril R. Tobin, 1934
 Philip S. Finnell, 1935
 Frank A. Cressey Jr., 1936–37
 Templeton Crocker, 1938–39
 Stanley Barrows, 1940
 Leon de Fremery, 1940–41
 Sidney W. Ford, 1942–43
 Ingraham Read, 1944
 Howard H. Hurst, 1945
 Dr. Jessie L. Carr, 1946
 Tracy W. Harron, 1947–48
 James Wilhite, 1950
 Arthur W. Ford, 1951–52
 Charles A Langlais, 1953
 Franklin D. Heastand, 1954
 Thomas A. Short, 1955
 James Michael, 1956–57
 Thomas C. Ingersoll, 1958
 Dennis Jordan, 1959–60
 Leavittt L. Olds, 1961
 Christopher M. Jenks, 1962
 A. L. McCormick, 1963
 Stanlus Z. Natcher, 1964
 Tomlinson Moseley, 1965
 Dennis Jordan, 1966
 William L. Stewart III, 1967–68
 Townsend L. Schoonmaker, 1969
 Aldo Alessio, 1970
 Albert T. Simpson, 1971
 Robert D. Ford, 1972
 Leonard P. Delmas, 1973
 Hays A. McLellan, 1974
 Robert C. Keefe, 1975
 John E. Klopfer, 1976
 Eugene C. Harter, 1977
 Emmett A. Murphy, 1977
 James C. Nichol, 1978
 Kevin A. O’Conell, 1979
 Charles W. Corbitt, 1980
 Kauko E. Hallikainen, 1981
 Thomas H. Conroy, 1982
 John W. McFarland, 1983
 Howard A. Looney, 1984
 Edmond Brovelli Jr., 1985
 Merv Shenson, 1986
 George E. Sayre, 1987
 John H. Keefe Jr., 1988
 Richard F. Ford, 1989
 Peter A. Culley, 1990
 Karl A. Limbach, 1991
 James M. Kennedy, 1992
 William M. LeRoy, 1993
 Thomas V. Allen Jr., 1994
 Grant Settlemier, 1995
 P. Terry Anderlini, 1996
 Duane M. Hines, 1997
 Hans P. Treuenfels, 1998
 Monroe J. Wingate, 1999
 Bruce H. Munro, 2000
 Steve Taft, 2001
 Charles J. Hart, 2002
 Thomas M. Quigg, 2003
 Terry G. Klaus, 2004
 Douglas E. Holm, 2005
 Richard A. Pfaff, 2006
 Ray Lotto, 2007
 Joseph J. Horn III, 2008
 John R. McNeill, 2009
 David H. Sneary, 2010
 Patrick M. Nolan, 2011
 Peter B. Stoneberg, 2012
 James M. Cascino, 2013
 George Dort, 2014
 Sean E. Svendsen, 2015
 Kimball Livingston, 2016
 James Kiriakis, 2017
 Theresa Brandner, 2018
 Paul Heineken, 2019
 Ken Glidewell, 2020

See also

List of International Council of Yacht Clubs members

Notes

References
St. Francis Yacht Club: 1927–2002. Photo Editor and Editor: Sandra J. Swanson (Hardcover - Apr 2002) 
St. Francis Yacht Club: Founded 1927 by Kimball Livingston (Hardcover - Apr 2002)

External links

Homepage of the St. Francis Yacht Club
The St. Francis Yacht Club's racing page on Facebook

1927 establishments in California
America's Cup yacht clubs
Sports organizations based in San Francisco
Gentlemen's clubs in California